William W. Gothard Jr. (born November 2, 1934) is an American Christian minister, speaker, and writer, and the founder of the Institute in Basic Life Principles (IBLP), an ultra-conservative Christian organization.
His conservative teachings encourage Bible memorization, large families, homeschooling, aversion to debt, male superiority and female obedience, and conservative dress.

At the height of Gothard's popularity during the 1970s, his Basic Youth Conflicts seminar was regularly filling auditoriums throughout the United States and beyond with attendance figures as large as ten thousand and more for a one-week seminar. In this way, he reached many in the evangelical community from the Baby Boomer generation during their teen years and young adulthood. Other seminars during this time included an Advanced Youth Conflicts seminar, as well as seminars for pastors, physicians, and legislators.

In 2014, he stepped down from IBLP after 34 women accused him of sexual harassment and molestation, with some incidents allegedly occurring when the victims were minors. In 2016, Gothard and IBLP were sued by a group of alleged victims. The lawsuit was dismissed in 2018, as the statute of limitations had been exceeded.

Biography 
Bill Gothard received his B.A. in biblical studies from Wheaton College, 1957 and then his M.A. in Christian education in 1961. He completed his Ph.D. in biblical studies at Louisiana Baptist University in 2004.

In 1961, Gothard started Campus Teams, an organization which changed its name to the Institute in Basic Youth Conflicts (IBYC) in 1974. The organization's name changed again in 1989 to the Institute in Basic Life Principles (IBLP), of which Gothard was the president and a board member until his resignation in 2014.

In 1984, Gothard founded the Advanced Training Institute (ATI), a homeschooling program with a curriculum based on the Sermon on the Mount.

Gothard had many political connections with Republican political leaders, including Mike Huckabee, Sonny Perdue, and Sarah Palin. His ministry was also popular with the reality TV Duggar family and others. He has never married.

Teaching 

Gothard's primary teaching, his "Basic Seminar", focuses on what he refers to as seven "Basic Life Principles". He claims that these principles are universal, and that people will suffer consequences for violating them. Gothard's principles are called Design, Authority, Responsibility, Suffering, Ownership, Freedom, and Success.

 The design principle is that people should understand the specific purpose for which God created them. Gothard writes: "A person's attitude toward himself has a profound influence on his attitude toward God, his family, his friends, his future, and many other significant areas of life."
 The authority principle is that inward peace results when people respect and honor the authorities (parents, government, etc.) that God has put into their lives. It is based on the idea that God gives direction, protection, and provision through human authorities.
 The responsibility principle is that a clear conscience results when people realize that they are responsible to God for every thought, word, action, and motive. Part of this principle is asking forgiveness from whoever has been offended.
 The suffering principle is that people should allow the hurts from offenders to reveal "blind spots" in their own lives. Genuine joy is a result of fully forgiving offenders.
 The ownership principle is that people are stewards, not owners, of their possessions. Gothard teaches that anger results from not yielding personal rights to God.
 The freedom principle is enjoying the desire and the power to do what is right. Gothard teaches that moral purity results from true freedom, and that the key to freedom is learning to walk in the Spirit of God and appropriate the victory already won by Jesus through his death, burial, and resurrection.
 The success principle is that when people learn to think God's thoughts by meditating on and memorizing scripture, they make wise decisions and fulfill their life purposes.

In addition to the Basic Seminar, Gothard also has an Advanced Seminar and an Anger Resolution Seminar. He also has a 49-week "Daily Success" series where he expounds on the "Commands of Christ" found in the Gospels. Gothard also offers "Total Health" training, which seeks to bring a Biblical view of sickness, and considers that there may be spiritual aspects of illness. His organization has published "Basic CARE Bulletins" and offers "Stress Resolution Seminars".

Gothard teaches that dating is morally dangerous and that courtship is the better alternative. Gothard encourages parents to be involved in their children's courtship, and that a father should be involved in his daughter's relationships, and should at the very least have the right to say "no" when a man asks to marry his daughter. Gothard also advocates conservative dress. Gothard's teachings discourage dating and "syncopated music", including Christian rock. He has warned that Cabbage Patch dolls are idolatrous.

Gothard has been the subject of much debate in Christian circles, and occasionally in mass media. Various books and articles have challenged Gothard's teachings on legalism, law, and grace, and questioned his handling of the IBLP ministry.

Sexual harassment allegations 
On February 27, 2014, the board of directors of the Institute in Basic Life Principles placed Gothard on indefinite administrative leave while it investigated claims that he sexually harassed several female employees and volunteers. No criminal activity was uncovered, but an investigation found that Gothard had acted in an "inappropriate manner". The claims had been publicized on the Recovering Grace website, which is a support group for former followers of Gothard's teachings. As many as 34 women who worked for Gothard have claimed that he harassed them. Gothard denied the allegations and admitted no wrongdoing but announced his resignation from the Institute in order "to listen to those who have ought [something] against him".

On June 17, 2014, IBLP issued a statement, summarizing the investigation conducted by "outside legal counsel". They asserted that although no criminal activity was uncovered, Gothard had acted in an "inappropriate manner" and so "is not permitted to serve in any counseling, leadership, or Board role within the IBLP ministry". In July 2015, Gothard re-launched his website, including testimonials from several women.

In 2016, Gothard and IBLP were sued by a group of alleged victims who accused him of sexual harassment and assault. The plaintiffs voluntarily dismissed their lawsuit in 2018, citing "unique complexities" with the statute of limitations, but emphasized: "We are not recanting our experiences or dismissing the incalculable damage that we believe Gothard has done."

Books 
 Advanced Seminar Textbook. Institute in Basic Life Principles, 1986, 
 Basic Preparation for Engagement. Institute in Basic Youth Conflicts, 1971, ASIN B00
 Basic Seminar Textbook. Institute in Basic Life Principles, 1979, 
 Institute in Basic Youth Conflicts: Research in Principles of Life. Institute in Basic Youth Conflicts, 1981, 
 Men's Manual, Vol. 1. Institute in Basic Youth Conflicts, 1979, 
 Men's Manual, Vol. 2. Institute in Basic Life Principles, 1983, 
 Nuestro Dios Celoso/Our Jealous God: El Amor que no me deja ir/The love that doesn't let me go. Editorial Unilit 2004, 
 Our Jealous God. Life Change Books, 2003. 
 Rebuilder's Guide. Institute in Basic Youth Conflicts, 1982. 
 Research in Principles of Life: Advanced Seminar Textbook. Institute in Basic Youth Conflicts 1986. 
 Rewards of Being Reviled. Life Change Books, 2004. 
 Self-Acceptance. Institute in Basic Youth Conflicts, 1984. ASIN B0007270AO
 The Amazing Way. Institute in Basic Life Principles, 2010. 
 The Power of Crying Out. Life Change Books, 2002, 
 The Power of Spoken Blessings. Life Change Books, 2004. 
 The Sevenfold Power of First Century Churches and Homes. Life Change Books, 2000. 
 Why Did God Let It Happen? Institute in Basic Life Principles, 2011.

References

External links 
 Official Bill Gothard Website
 Official Bill Gothard Twitter
 Institute in Basic Life Principles
 Bill Gothard Seminars

1934 births
Living people
20th-century Protestant religious leaders
21st-century Protestant religious leaders
American Christian religious leaders
American Christian writers
American people of Mexican descent
Hispanic and Latino American writers
Leaders of Christian parachurch organizations
Louisiana Baptist University alumni
Wheaton College (Illinois) alumni